The Albert P. Crary Science and Engineering Center (CSEC), located at McMurdo Station, was dedicated in November 1991 by the National Science Foundation (NSF). The laboratory is named in honor of geophysicist and glaciologist Albert P. Crary. There are five pods making for 4,320 square meters of working area that includes a two-story core, a biology pod, earth sciences and atmospheric sciences pods, and an aquarium. CSEC was built to replace older, outdated science buildings that were built as early as 1959.

Facilities
The second floor of CSEC has a computer room, a library, and classrooms.

References

External links
 Crary Lab Floor Plans

Educational institutions established in 1991
McMurdo Station
1991 establishments in Antarctica